Ross Langdon (born 11 March 1951) is an Australian water polo player. He competed in the men's tournament at the 1976 Summer Olympics.

References

External links
 

1951 births
Living people
Australian male water polo players
Olympic water polo players of Australia
Water polo players at the 1976 Summer Olympics
Place of birth missing (living people)